La orgía de los muertos (translated as Orgy of the Dead) a.k.a. The Hanging Woman (US theatrical release), Beyond the Living Dead, Return of the Zombies and Bracula: Terror of the Living Dead, is a 1972 Spanish/ Italian horror film directed by José Luis Merino, starring Paul Naschy and Dyanik Zurakowska. The film was shot in March 1972, but wasn't shown in Spanish theaters (as La orgía de los muertos) until September 3, 1973. It was shown theatrically in the U.S. in 1974 as The Hanging Woman, and then was later re-released there as Beyond the Living Dead. It was released in Germany on April 6, 1976 as Der Totenchor der Knochenmanner/ Death Chorus of the Skeletons, and re-released in Germany on March 1, 1977 as Die Bestie aus dem Totenreich/ The Beast from the Death Realm. It was shown in the U.K. as Zombies - Terror of the Living Dead, in France as Les Orgies Macabres, and in Australia as Bracula, Terror of the Living Dead.

Merino, the director, pleaded with Naschy to appear in the film as a personal favor to him, upon learning that Naschy had just finished shooting his Horror Rises From the Tomb in February and was available for a very short time. Naschy originally turned him down, as he thought the brief role of Igor the gravedigger was too unimportant and lackluster. Merino allowed Naschy to rework the script and beef up the character, adding a necrophilia angle to Igor. Ironically, Naschy's gravedigger wound up becoming the most memorable character in the whole film.

In April of 1980, the German distributor Nobis-Film negotiated a deal to re-release this film yet again in Germany, this time under the title Die Nackte Gottin der Zombies/ The Naked Goddess of the Zombies, but the deal fell through at the last minute.

Plot 

Serge Chekov inherits his uncle's estate, only to discover that Professor Droila, a mad scientist, has taken residence in the basement.  As Chekov investigates further, he learns that Droila is reanimating the dead with the help of a necrophiliac grave robber by the name of Igor.  In the end, Droila's zombies turn against him.

Cast 
 Stelvio Rosi (credited as Stan Cooper) as Serge Chekov
 Dyanik Zurakowska as Doris Droila
 Paul Naschy as Igor the necrophiliac
 Gérard Tichy as Professor Leon Droila       
 Maria Pia Conte as Countess Nadia Minajli
 Aurora de Alba as Mary Minajli
 Carlos Quiney as Ivan the butler
 Isarco Ravaioli as the Mayor
 Pasquales Basile as the detective
 Eleonora Vargas
 Carla Mancini

Release 
Since the 1980s, the film has been released on VHS Home Video over the years under three different titles...The Hanging Woman, Return of the Zombies and Beyond the Living Dead.

The Troma DVD release (as The Hanging Woman) was on September 29, 2009 in the USA, with audio commentary by director Jose Luis Merino, an interview with actor Paul Naschy, and as a bonus, the seldom seen Sid Pink film "The Sweet Sound of Death" (starring Dyanik Zurakowska).

Reception 
Writing in The Zombie Movie Encyclopedia, academic Peter Dendle said, "Scenic nineteenth-century Skopje forms the eerie and beautiful background for this grab bag of twisted motifs, suspect ideology, and gruesome zombies."  Bill Gibron of PopMatters rated it 7/10 and wrote, "While not a classic, The Hanging Woman definitely has its high points. It’s got some great locations, a splash of sinister finesse, more than a few ripe red herrings, and a performance by Naschy that’s not to be missed." Stuart Galbraith IV of DVD Talk rated it 2/5 stars and wrote, "It's tough being negative on what was obviously a labor of love for those involved with its release, but The Hanging Woman (1973), a Spanish horror-mystery featuring beefy genre heavyweight Paul Naschy in a supporting role, is a big disappointment."  David Johnson of DVD Verdict wrote, "There are some premium bizzaro moments to be found in The Hanging Woman" and recommended it to fans of Naschy and slow-paced Hammer Films.

References

External links
 
 The Hanging Woman at Variety Distribution
  Hanging Woman at the Troma Entertainment film database

1973 films
1973 horror films
Italian independent films
Spanish independent films
Troma Entertainment films
Films scored by Francesco De Masi
1970s Spanish-language films
Italian horror films
Spanish horror films
1973 independent films